Yagotino is a rural locality (a selo) and the administrative center of Yagotinsky Selsoviet, Blagoveshchensky District, Altai Krai, Russia. The population was 600 as of 2013. It was founded in 1909. There are 8 streets.

Geography 
Yagotino is located 23 km southwest of Blagoveshchenka (the district's administrative centre) by road. Orlean is the nearest rural locality.

References 

Rural localities in Blagoveshchensky District, Altai Krai